Ch'iyar T'ikhi (Aymara ch'iyara black, t'ikhi a hairstyle of the indigenous women where the ends of the hair are tied, "black t'ikhi", Hispanicized spelling Chiarthiji, Chiartiji) is a mountain in the Cordillera Real in the Andes of Bolivia, about  high. It is situated in the La Paz Department, Los Andes Province, Batallas Municipality. The rivers Pura Purani and Jayllawaya, both tributaries of Lake Titicaca, flow along its northern and southern slopes.

See also
 Warawarani

References 

Mountains of La Paz Department (Bolivia)